Joseph Liu Xinhong (Simplified Chinese: 刘新红, Traditional Chinese: 劉新紅) is the Chinese Patriotic Catholic Association-sponsored Bishop of Anhui. As a layman, he was considered the strongman of the Chinese Patriotic Catholic Association, whose deputy chairman he was. This association was established in 1957 to oppose relations with Rome. Consecrated as bishop in 2006 without pontifical mandate, he was automatically excommunicated.

On September 22, 2018, Pope Francis lifted the excommunication of Joseph Liu Xinhong and other six bishops previously appointed by the Chinese government without a pontifical mandate.

See also
Joseph Ma Yinglin
Zhan Silu
Joseph Li Shan
Bernardine Dong Guangqing

References

External Links
 https://www.catholic-hierarchy.org/bishop/bliuxinho.html

21st-century Roman Catholic bishops in China
People temporarily excommunicated by the Catholic Church
Chinese Roman Catholic bishops
Year of birth missing (living people)
Living people
Bishops of the Catholic Patriotic Association